Yellow Quill 90-9 is an Indian reserve of the Yellow Quill First Nation in Saskatchewan. In the 2016 Canadian Census, it recorded a population of 50 living in 14 of its 15 total private dwellings.

References

Indian reserves in Saskatchewan